Nyssicus rosalesi is a species of beetle in the family Cerambycidae. It was described by Joly and Martinez in 1981.

References

Elaphidiini
Beetles described in 1981